Castletown in the civil parish of Shocklach Oviatt and District, in Cheshire, England is a deserted village located at  whose sole remains are earthworks. The site is a Scheduled Ancient Monument. The Bishop Bennet Way passes the site.

References

Former populated places in Cheshire
Archaeological sites in Cheshire
Scheduled monuments in Cheshire